Adam D'Angelo (born August 21, 1984) is an American internet entrepreneur. He is best known as the co-founder and CEO of Quora, based in Mountain View, California. He was chief technology officer of Facebook, and also served as its vice president of engineering, until 2008. In June 2009, he started Quora. He invested $20 million of his own money into Quora as part of their Series B round of financing. He is a member of the board of directors of OpenAI.

Education 

Adam D'Angelo attended Phillips Exeter Academy for high school. There, he developed the Synapse Media Player (a music suggestion software) along with Mark Zuckerberg and others.

In 2002, he attended California Institute of Technology, where he graduated with a B.S. in Computer Science.

In 2004, while attending college, D'Angelo also created the website BuddyZoo, which allowed users to upload their AIM buddy list and compare them with those of other users. The service also generated graphs based on the buddy lists.

Honors 
In 2001, he was placed eighth at the USA Computing Olympiad as a high school student and he won a silver medal at the 2002 International Olympiad in Informatics.

ACM International Collegiate Programming Contest (ICPC): California Institute of Technology Beavers (team of 3), World Finalists 2003, 2004; North American Champions 2003; World Finals Silver Medals 2004; World Finals co-coach 2005.

In 2005, he was one of the top 24 finalists in the Algorithm Coding Competition of the Topcoder Collegiate Challenge.

Other work 

D'Angelo was an advisor to and investor in Instagram before its acquisition by Facebook in 2012.

In 2018, he joined the board of directors of OpenAI.

Achievements 
Fortune magazine included D'Angelo as runner-up in its "Smartest people in tech" article in 2010.

References

External links

Facebook employees
California Institute of Technology alumni
Living people
Businesspeople from California
Phillips Exeter Academy alumni
American chief technology officers
21st-century American businesspeople
American technology chief executives
1984 births
Competitive programmers
American people of Italian descent